Senator Irwin may refer to:

Mitch Irwin (born 1952), Michigan State Senate
Robert Irwin (North Carolina politician) (1738–1800), North Carolina State Senate
William Irwin (California politician) (1827–1886), California State Senate

See also
Senator Erwin (disambiguation)
Senator Irvin (disambiguation)